Kidan habesha (alt. ije tebab) is a clothing style from [habesha name="Dresser2011"></ref> It comprises a white shirt and pants. Then a thin, gauze-like, fabric is wrapped around the shoulders and chest. Sometimes, men take the extra material and wrap it around their waist making a skirt on top of their pants, then wrap it around their shoulders. This kind of clothing is worn with intricately designed stick and white shoes. It is mostly worn at weddings and cultural events.

Eritrean clothing